Cathleen Chaffee is an American curator, writer, and art historian specializing in contemporary art. She currently serves as the chief curator of the Buffalo AKG Art Museum (formerly the Albright–Knox Art Gallery) in Buffalo, New York, where she joined in January 2014.

Biography 
Chaffee attended Ithaca College; followed by study at Courtauld Institute of Art where she received a M.A. degree; and the New York University Institute of Fine Arts where she received a Ph.D. in 2013. Her dissertation was Décors: Marcel Broodthaers's Late Exhibition Practice, 1974-1975, and her advisor was Robert Storr.

She previously worked at the Yale University Art Gallery from 2010 to 2013 in New Haven; the Museum of Modern Art from 2007 to 2008 in New York City; and the Cleveland Museum of Art from 2001 to 2004. Notable exhibitions curated by Chaffee include Stanley Whitney: the Italian Paintings (in 2022); Introducing Tony Conrad: A Retrospective (in 2018); Joe Bradley (in 2017); Clyfford Still / Mark Bradford (in 2016); Erin Shirreff (in 2016); Eija-Liisa Ahtila: Ecologies of Drama (from 2015 to 2016); Screen Play: Life in an Animated World (in 2015); Overtime: The Art of Work (in 2015); and Looking at Tomorrow: Light and Language from The Panza Collection, 1967–1990 (from 2015 to 2016).

She was awarded a Curatorial Fellowship from the VIA Art Fund in 2018; and a Fulbright Fellowship in 2008 to Belgium.

Publications 
 Chaffee, Cathleen; de Bellis, Vincenzo (2022). Stanley Whitney: The Italian Paintings. Buffalo, NY: Buffalo AKG Art Museum. 
 
 
 
 
 
 
 
 Chaffee, Cathleen; Porter, Jenelle (2015). Erin Shirreff. Buffalo: Albright-Knox Art Gallery. ISBN 978-1887457187.
 Chaffee, Cathleen, ed. (2015). Eija-Liisa Ahtila: Ecologies of Drama: Essays, Interviews, and Scripts. Eija-Liisa Ahtila (artist). Buffalo: Albright-Knox Art Gallery.
 Gross, Jennifer, ed. (2015). Drawing Redefined: Roni Horn, Esther Kläs, Joëlle Tuerlinckx, Richard Tuttle and Jorinde Voigt (art exhibition). Cornelia H. Butler (contributor), Cathleen Chaffee (contributor), Veronica Roberts (Contributor), Lexi Lee Sullivan (Contributor). Lincoln, Mass.: deCordova Sculpture Park and Museum. ISBN 978-0300215915.

See also 
 Women in the art history field

References

External links 
 Profile at Albright-Knox
Profile at Yale School of Art

Year of birth missing (living people)
Living people
Women art historians
American women curators
American curators
21st-century American historians
Ithaca College alumni
Alumni of the Courtauld Institute of Art
New York University Institute of Fine Arts alumni